Golf Digest is a monthly golf magazine published by Warner Bros. Discovery through its sports unit under its Warner Bros. Discovery Golf division. It is a generalist golf publication covering recreational golf and men's and women's competitive golf. The magazine started by John F. Barnett in 1950 in Chicago, moved to Connecticut in 1964 and was sold to The New York Times Company in 1969. The Times company sold their magazine division to Condé Nast in 2001. The headquarters of Golf Digest is in New York City relocated from Connecticut. On May 13, 2019, Discovery, Inc. acquired Golf Digest from Condé Nast, in order to integrate with GolfTV.

"The World's 100 Greatest Golf Courses" - International
Golf Digest produces a biennial ranking of the world's best golf courses.  the top ten were:

 Royal County Down Golf Club – Newcastle, Northern Ireland
 Tara Iti Golf Club – Mangawhai, New Zealand
 Muirfield – Gullane, Scotland
 Royal Dornoch Golf Club – Dornoch, Scotland
 Royal Melbourne Golf Club (West Course) – Black Rock, Victoria, Australia
 Old Course at St Andrews – St Andrews, Scotland
 Morfontaine Golf Club – Mortefontaine, Oise, France
 Royal Portrush Golf Club – Dunluce, County Antrim, Northern Ireland
 South Cape Owners Club – Namhae Island, South Korea
 Trump Turnberry – (near Ailsa Craig), Scotland

"America's 100 Greatest Golf Courses"
Since 1965, Golf Digest has produced biennial rankings of "America's 100 Greatest Golf Courses". The courses are voted on by a panel of several hundred golf experts. The magazine also produces lists of the best new courses, the best golf resorts, the best courses in each U.S. state and best American golf courses for women. Before the "Greatest" rankings were introduced in 1985, Golf Digest produced lists called at different times America's 100 Most Testing Courses and America's 100 Greatest Tests of Golf.

The top ten on the 2020–21 list are as follows:

 Pine Valley Golf Club – Pine Valley, New Jersey
 Augusta National Golf Club – Augusta, Georgia  
 Cypress Point Club – Pebble Beach, California			
 Shinnecock Hills Golf Club – Southampton, New York 			
 Oakmont Country Club – Oakmont, Pennsylvania 
 Merion Golf Club (East Course) – Ardmore, Pennsylvania
 National Golf Links of America – Southampton, New York		
 Pebble Beach Golf Links – Pebble Beach, California
 Fishers Island Club – Fishers Island, New York		
 Sand Hills Golf Club - Mullen, Nebraska

"America's Top 50 Courses for Women"
In 2010, Golf Digest produced its inaugural ranking of "America's Top 50 Courses for Women". In creating the ranking, the magazine used nominations and evaluations by its panel of over 100 female raters as well as the woman-friendly criteria established by the editors. Those criteria included: at least one tee less than 5,300 yards; at least two sets of tees with USGA slope and course ratings for women; run-up areas to most or all greens and minimal forced carries for those playing from the forward tees.

The top ten on the 2013 list are as follows:

 Pine Needles Lodge & Golf Club – Southern Pines, North Carolina
 Sea Island Golf Club – St. Simons, Georgia
 The Boulders Resort and Golf Club – Carefree, Arizona
 Bandon Dunes Golf Resort (Old MacDonald)– Bandon, Oregon
 Running Y Ranch – Klamath Falls, Oregon
 Omni Amelia Island Plantation Resort (Ocean Links) - Amelia Island, Florida
 LPGA International (champions) - Daytona Beach, Florida
 Rope Rider Golf Course at Suncadia Resort - Cle Elum, Washington
 Keystone Resort (River) - Keystone, Colorado
 Grand Cypress Golf Club (East/North) - Orlando, Florida

"America's 100 Greatest Public Golf Courses"
Alongside the "100 Greatest Courses" ranking, and using the same methodology, Golf Digest publishes a list of "America's 100 Greatest Public Golf Courses". In this context, "public" means a golf course that is open to play by the public, as opposed to a private club—not necessarily a course operated by a governmental entity.

The top ten on the 2019 list, published in May 2019, was as follows:

Pebble Beach Golf Links – Pebble Beach, California
Pacific Dunes Golf Course – Bandon, Oregon
Whistling Straits (Straits) – Haven, Wisconsin
Kiawah Island (Ocean Course) – Kiawah Island, South Carolina
Shadow Creek Golf Course – North Las Vegas, Nevada 
Pinehurst (No. 2) – Pinehurst, North Carolina  
Bandon Dunes Golf Course – Bandon, Oregon
Bethpage State Park (Black) – Farmingdale, New York
Erin Hills Golf Course – Erin, Wisconsin
Spyglass Hill Golf Course – Pebble Beach, California

Of these courses, the only one that is operated by a governmental entity is Bethpage Black.

In addition to its national rankings, Golf Digest also ranks courses at a state level.

"100 Best Golf Courses Outside the United States"

The magazine also compiles a list of the leading courses outside the United States. This is created using information from national golf associations, plus votes by the same panelists supplemented by some additional ones with international knowledge.

In 2007, the most represented countries were Scotland with 14 courses in the top 100, Canada with 10, England with 10, Canada with 9, and Australia and Republic of Ireland with 8. The top 10 were:

 Royal County Down Golf Club – Newcastle, Northern Ireland
 Old Course at St Andrews – St. Andrews, Scotland
 Royal Dornoch Golf Club (championship Course) – Dornoch, Scotland
 Royal Portrush Golf Club (Dunluce Course) – Portrush, Northern Ireland
 Muirfield – Gullane, Scotland
 Royal Melbourne Golf Club (Composite Course) – Melbourne, Australia
 Ballybunion Golf Club (Old Course) – Ballybunion, Ireland
 Turnberry (Ailsa Course) – Ayrshire, Scotland
 Carnoustie Golf Links – Carnoustie, Scotland
 Cape Kidnappers Golf Course – Hawke's Bay, New Zealand

In 2005, the most represented countries were Scotland and Canada with 13 courses each in the top 100. The top 10 were:

 Old Course at St Andrews – St. Andrews, Scotland
 Royal Melbourne Golf Club – Melbourne, Australia
 Royal Portrush Golf Club – Portrush, Northern Ireland
 Royal County Down Golf Club – Newcastle, Northern Ireland
 Royal Dornoch Golf Club – Dornoch, Scotland
 Muirfield – Gullane, Scotland
 Ballybunion Golf Club – Ballybunion, Ireland
 New South Wales Golf Club – Sydney, Australia
 National Golf Club – Woodbridge, Ontario, Canada
 St. George's Golf and Country Club – Toronto, Ontario, Canada

Recognition
In 2009, Golf Digest was nominated for a National Magazine Awards by the American Society of Magazine Editors in the Magazine Section in recognition of the excellence of a regular section of a magazine based on voice, originality and unified presentation.

Female golfers
In April 2014, Golf Digest was widely criticized when, after neglecting to picture a female golfer on their cover for six years, they chose to picture model Paulina Gretzky in a revealing outfit as their May 2014 cover. The move was "particularly frustrating" to LPGA golfers. LPGA Tour Commissioner Mike Whan issued a statement echoing the concerns expressed by LPGA players. In the October 2014 edition, U.S. Women's Open winner Michelle Wie appeared on the cover.

In May 2016, the magazine again featured a female celebrity in the cover, Paige Spiranac (who was, at the time, a professional golfer), which was criticized by veteran golfer Juli Inkster.

See also
Kingdom magazine

References

External links
Official site
Official site of Golf World magazine, a Golf Digest publication
Composite of all U.S. courses ever ranked 
Official site for Golf Digest Golf Schools

1950 establishments in the United States
Warner Bros. Discovery brands
Digest
Magazines formerly owned by Condé Nast
Magazines established in 1950
Magazines published in Connecticut
Magazines published in New York City
Sports magazines published in the United States
Turner Sports